Cyclosia midamia is a moth in the family Zygaenidae. It is found in Malaysia and on Borneo. Five subspecies recognized.

It disguises itself to resemble the spotted blue crow. It secretes liquid hydrogen cyanide through their legs as little droplets. Though unlike the butterfly, and so many other insects, Cyclosia midamia produces its own poison made out of the chemical compound cyanide.

Subspecies
Cyclosia midamia alcathoe Jordan, 1907
Cyclosia midamia dolosa Jordan, 1907 (Java)
Cyclosia midamia padangana Jordan, 1907 (Sumatra)
Cyclosia midamia submaculans Walker, 1859 (Singapore)
Cyclosia midamia trepsichrois Butler, 1883 (Nias)

References

External links
jpmoth.org
sinobug

Moths described in 1853
Chalcosiinae